The 2016 IQA World Cup is the third edition of the IQA World Cup, the international quidditch championship organized by the International Quidditch Association. It was held in Frankfurt, Germany on 23–24 July 2016. Australia won the Cup 150*–130 against the United States, who had won all the previous editions. 21 nations competed, including Australia, Canada, Ireland, and the United Kingdom. A crowdfunding campaign aimed to send the Ugandan team as the first ever African nation to compete internationally. However, the team members failed to obtain a German visa and withdrew from the competition. The Peruvian team also withdrew before the competition due to a lack of funds. A documentary entitled Fly The Movie: Journey To Frankfurt followed the British team in their preparation before the Cup.

Participating teams 

24 teams were expected to participate to the Cup:

Draw
The 2014 World medalists and the 2015 European finalists were placed in Pod 1. Other teams who have participated in international tournaments filled up Pods 2 through 4 based on their finishing rank. Teams participating for the first time were placed randomly in Pods 4 and 5.

The teams were drawn into five groups of four or five teams, with one team per pod in each group, and Pod 5 teams assigned to three randomly chosen groups. Every group was guaranteed at least one non-European team. However, with Peru and Uganda withdrawing, only one five-team pool was left, and Pool 1 consisted of European teams only.

Structure
After the pool play, all teams were seeded and moved on to the bracket phase. Teams were seeded according to the following criteria:
 Rank in pool;
 Number of losses;
 Head-to-head result;
 Average point differential (With a cap of 120, includes snitch catches);
 Snitch catch percentage;
 Coin flip.

Since all teams would participate to the bracket phase, seeds 12 to 21 started with play-in games whereas seeds 1 to 11 got a bye to the round of 16. During bracket play, each round beginning with the round of 16 generated a consolation bracket. The bracket phase determined the final ranking for teams 1 to 16.

Results
Asterisks* indicate the team that ended the game by catching the snitch.

Pool play

Pool 1

Pool 2

Pool 3

Pool 4

Pool 5

Championship bracket

Quarter-final consolation

Round of 16 consolation

References

2016
2016 in German sport
Sports competitions in Frankfurt
July 2016 sports events in Germany